Wendlebury Halt was a railway station on the Varsity Line, located  east of the village of Wendlebury in Alchester. The London and North Western Railway opened the halt in 1905 and the London, Midland and Scottish Railway closed it in 1926.

Routes

References

Sources
 

Disused railway stations in Oxfordshire
Former London and North Western Railway stations
Railway stations in Great Britain opened in 1905
Railway stations in Great Britain closed in 1917
Railway stations in Great Britain opened in 1919
Railway stations in Great Britain closed in 1926